Cathy Baker  (born January 21, 1947) is an American actress, best known for her work on the American television variety show Hee Haw.

Life and career
Catherine Graves Baker was born in Edinburg, Texas. She graduated from Edinburg High School; and the University of Texas at Austin with a major in radio and TV.

She was cast to be on Hee Haw in 1969 while working as a painter at the WLAC-TV studios where the show was being filmed in Nashville. Unlike most of the women (aptly named the ‘’Hee Haw Honeys’’) who dressed in sexy and provocative outfits on-screen, Baker donned either tom boy overalls or a plain unassuming dress. Originally slated to be a regular weekly member, Baker became the show's emcee. She became one of the show's longest cast members; being titled: “Miss Hee Haw”. Baker ended each show with her signature sign-off: “That’s All!” During full cast sing-a-longs, Baker was sometimes paired with the show's mascot, Beauregard: a lovable, long-eared bloodhound.

In 1970, she appeared in the television special Swing Out, Sweet Land; and in 1975, she appeared in the film W.W. and the Dixie Dancekings.

Baker lives in Orange, Virginia with her husband, who is a lawyer. They have two sons.

References

External links
 
 Set Girl Given Shot at Stardom: Jack Hurst

1947 births
Living people
People from Edinburg, Texas
University of Texas at Austin alumni